Eloy David Rojas Leandro (born 25 March 1967) is a Venezuelan former professional boxer in the Featherweight division.

Rojas turned pro in 1986 and won the WBA and Lineal Featherweight Titles in 1993 by defeating Yong-Kyun Park by decision.  He defended the titles six times before losing them to Wilfredo Vazquez in 1996 via TKO in a fight which he was leading on all cards.  Rojas never challenged for a world title again, and retired in 2005 after a loss to Herman Ngoudjo.

See also 
Lineal championship

References 
 

|-

|-

1967 births
Living people
Featherweight boxers
Venezuelan male boxers
People from Caracas
World Boxing Association champions